Carré ViiiP 2011 was a rip-off of the French version of the reality show Big Brother carrying on from a previous similar show, Loft Story. It aired on TF1 and was presented by Elsa Fayer, also the presenter of Qui veut épouser mon fils?. The series began filming on March 18, 2011, when 16 people entered a purpose-built house on the outskirts of Paris. The show was originally set to run until May 27, 2011. However, following bad ratings TF1 decided to end the show on March 31, 2011, only 13 days after it had begun.

The show resembles the NRJ12 program Les Anges de la télé-réalité because of a review of former reality TV candidates.

Scenario
The scenario of Carré ViiiP resembles that of other reality TV programs of confinement: sixteen candidates (eight of whom were stars of earlier French reality TV and eight unknowns) are locked in the largest space ever built for a reality TV show (700m², excluding the external area), appointed in comfort and luxury worthy of the grandest palace (spa, jacuzzi, sauna, massage room). A large pool is at the center of the room to allow candidates to swim. Outside, there is a large terrace for sunny days. This space is built in La Plaine Saint-Denis, as is the case with many TV reality shows. At the end of the adventure, one of sixteen participants will walk away with the jackpot of €150,000. Due to the show's premature cancellation, the prize money was not given, as there was no winner. According to Le Parisien, all sixteen candidates were instead paid an undisclosed signed term fee, as if they had spent ten weeks in the house.

Housemates

ViiiP

Wannaviiip

Guest Star
Mickaël Vendetta (La Ferme Célébrités 2010 's winner) during the first week.
Jean-Marc Morandini (Presenter of Morandini!) during the Day 11 (week 2).

Tops & Flops 
Every Monday, the ViiiPomètre tells Viiips and Wannaviiips their popularity outside the show.

Nominations Table
Housemates are split into two teams.
 – ViiiP: Benoît, Thomas, Afida, Giuseppe, Cindy, FX, Marjolaine and Alexandra.
 – Wannaviiip: Candice, Noam, Kévin, Aurélie, Beverly, JP, Alexandre and Xénia.

Each week, Viiips and Wannaviiips each nominate two people of the opposite team that they want to face the public vote. Every week, the most popular housemate will be exempt.

Percentages
Week 1: 
 Round 1: FX (39%)
Round 2: Afida (41%), Alexandre (38%)
Evicted: Xenia (21%).
Week 2:
 Round 1:
Round 2:
Evicted:

References

External links
 Official website for Carré ViiiP 

2011 French television seasons